Seán Ryan (born 27 January 1943) is a former Irish Labour Party politician. He was a Teachta Dála (TD) for Dublin North from 1989 to 1997 and 1998 to 2007.

Ryan was born in Dublin and educated at North Strand Vocational School, the College of Technology, Bolton Street, the College of Industrial Relations, and the School of Management, Rathmines College of Commerce. Ryan was formerly Production Controller and Work Study Supervisor with CIÉ and Iarnród Éireann before entering into full-time politics.

In 1985 he was elected to Fingal County Council. Ryan was first elected to Dáil Éireann at the 1989 general election, serving until the 1997 general election when he lost his seat. He was subsequently elected to Seanad Éireann, but was re-elected to the 28th Dáil at the Dublin North by-election on 11 March 1998, following the resignation of Fianna Fáil TD Ray Burke. The by-election for his Seanad seat was won by Fianna Fáil's John Cregan.

Ryan was re-elected to the Dáil at the 2002 election and was the Labour Party Spokesperson on Older People's Issues from 2002 to 2007.

He indicated in 2005 that he did not intend to stand at the following general election. At a selection convention, his brother Brendan Ryan was selected to stand as the Labour Party candidate in Dublin North for the next election, but was not elected.

See also
Families in the Oireachtas

References

 

1943 births
Living people
Councillors of Dublin County Council
Labour Party (Ireland) TDs
Members of the 21st Seanad
Members of the 26th Dáil
Members of the 27th Dáil
Members of the 28th Dáil
Members of the 29th Dáil
Local councillors in Fingal
Alumni of Dublin Institute of Technology
Labour Party (Ireland) senators
Alumni of the National College of Ireland